The Littlest Man Band was started by Scott Klopfenstein of Orange County, California. Scott was a long-time member of Reel Big Fish, a popular ska punk band. Scott had written a number of songs over the years that did not conform to the usual style of Reel Big Fish.  He performed some of these by himself under the pseudonym "The Littlest Man" before being joined by several musicians well known to him from the Long Beach music scene, the majority of whom are fellow ex-members of the band The Scholars.

This differs from the music he and the fellow Reel Big Fish member Dan Regan had been performing previously, but the new piano-bar style was well received by fans. Often, both bands would play at the same venue.

LMB has not performed since May 25, 2005, and rumors circulated regarding the band's break-up. Klopfenstein commented that due to his move to the East Coast, he would no longer be performing with these musicians. As of 2018, the band has been active on social media, with Klopfenstein acknowledging the forthcoming release of previously unreleased music to support the production and release of a new album from the band.

Members 
 Scott Klopfenstein - Vocals, Guitar, Keys
 Vincent Walker - Keys, Guitar
 Jake Berrey - Bass
 Mitch Bruzzese - Drums
 Tavis Werts - Trumpet
 Prichard Pearce - Trombone
 Edgar Guadiana - Sax, Flute

Former members 
 Jesse Wilder - Keys, Guitar, Vocals
 Tony Ortega - Trumpet
 Dan Regan - Trombone
 Greg Parkin - Drums

Discography

Albums 
 Better Book Ends (September 23, 2004)
 Demos and Practices (early 2004)
 Rare Doo-Dee - Live recordings and demos, including the infamous "doo-dee" incident on the first KUCI show. (2008)

Live 
 Live on KUCI (April 2, 2005)

See also 
 Reel Big Fish
 The Scholars
 Suburban Legends
 The Forces of Evil

References

External links 
 Official website

Rock music groups from California
Musical groups established in 2003
2003 establishments in California
Musical groups disestablished in 2005